Chlorocrambe is a genus of flowering plants belonging to the family Brassicaceae.

Its native range is Western North America.

Species:
 Chlorocrambe hastata (S.Watson) Rydb.

References

Brassicaceae
Brassicaceae genera